Jamal Chandler (born 26 November 1989) is a Barbadian international footballer who plays as a midfielder. He is currently playing for Paradise.

International career

International goals
Scores and results list the Barbados's goal tally first.

References

External links
 

1989 births
Living people
Barbadian footballers
Barbados international footballers
Association football midfielders
Barbados Defence Force SC players
Paradise FC (Barbados) players